Eupithecia mustangata is a moth in the family Geometridae. It is found in Afghanistan, northern Pakistan, Jammu & Kashmir, northern India (Himachal Pradesh) and Nepal. It is found at altitudes between 2,100 and 4,300 meters.

Adults are variable in size, depth of colour, and the breadth of the transverse lines.

References

Moths described in 1961
mustangata
Moths of Asia